The 2019–20 Futbol Club Barcelona season was the club's 120th season in existence and the 89th consecutive season in the top flight of Spanish football. Barcelona competed in La Liga, Copa del Rey, Supercopa de España and UEFA Champions League. The season covered the period from 1 July 2019 to 14 August 2020.

This club endured its worst season in years, going trophyless for the first time since 2007–08. Head coach Ernesto Valverde was replaced by Quique Setién mid-season after a Supercopa defeat to Atlético Madrid, but that did not improve the team's fortunes, as Barça lost the closely fought title race to Real Madrid and was eliminated by Bayern Munich in the one-legged Champions League quarter-final, infamously losing 2–8.

Season overview

June
On 26 June, Barcelona announced the departure of Jasper Cillessen to Valencia for a fee of €35 million. The following day on 27 June, Barcelona announced the signing of Neto from Valencia for a fee of €26 million plus €9 million in add-ons.

On 30 June, Denis Suárez was sold to Celta Vigo for €12.9 million plus €3.1 million in add-ons.

July
On 3 July, the Vice President of Sports Jordi Mestre resigned.

On 12 July, Barcelona signed Antoine Griezmann from Atlético Madrid after triggering his €120,000,000 buyout clause. Barcelona also sold Adrián Ortolá to CD Tenerife for an undisclosed price.

On 16 July, Barcelona activated Marc Cucurella's buy-back clause of €4 million, only two months after Eibar had permanently signed him for €2 million.

On 18 July, Barcelona and Getafe reached an agreement for the loan of Cucurella to the Madrid side for the rest of the season with an option to buy for €6 million.

August
On 2 August, Barça and Russian Premier League club Zenit St Petersburg agreed to the transfer of Malcom for a fee of €45,000,000 plus variables.

On 4 August, Barça and Real Betis reached an agreement for the signing of Junior Firpo for €18 million plus €12 million in variables.

On 16 August, Barça started their season in a 0–1 away defeat to Athletic Bilbao from a late winner from Aritz Aduriz.

On 18 August, Barça and Bayern Munich reached an agreement for the loan of Philippe Coutinho to the German side for the rest of the season with an option to buy for €120 million.

On 25 August, Barça defeated Real Betis in a 5–2 home rout, goals from Antoine Griezmann, Carles Pérez, Jordi Alba, and Arturo Vidal led the Blaugrana to victory.

On 31 August, Barça drew 2–2 away at Osasuna with goals from Ansu Fati and Arthur, with the forward becoming the youngest player in FC Barcelona's history to score a goal in La Liga (16 years and 304 days).

September
On 2 September, Rafinha extended his contract by one year until 2021 and moved to Celta Vigo on loan for the rest of the season.

On September 14, Barça defeated Valencia in a 5−2 win at home. Goals from Ansu Fati, Frenkie de Jong, Gerard Piqué, and a brace from Luis Suárez once again led the Blaugrana to victory.

On 17 September, Barça started their Champions League campaign with a 0−0 away draw with Borussia Dortmund.

On 21 September, Barça suffered a 2−0 away loss to Granada CF, conceding goals from Antonio Puertas and Álvaro Vadillo.

On 24 September, Barça defeated Villarreal CF 2−1 at home. First half goals from Antoine Griezmann and Arthur were enough for the home side to claim victory.

On 28 September, Barça defeated Getafe CF 2–0 away from home. Luis Suárez and Junior Firpo got themselves on the score sheet. Clemént Lenglet got sent off and received his first red card of the season.

October
On 2 October, Barça defeated Inter Milan 2–1 at home in the UEFA Champions League. Inter scored early through Lautaro Martínez but Barça came-back after Luis Suárez scored twice to earn the victory.

On 6 October, Barça defeated Sevilla FC 4–0 at home. Luis Suárez, Arturo Vidal, Ousmane Dembélé and Lionel Messi (both with their first goals of the season) lead the Blaugrana to victory. Both Dembélé and Ronald Araújo got sent off.

On 19 October, Barça defeated SD Eibar 3–0 away from home. Goals from Antoine Griezmann, Lionel Messi, and Luis Suárez helped the Blaugrana extend their winning run to five games.

On 23 October, Barça defeated Slavia Prague in the UEFA Champions League 2–1 away from home. Goals coming in from Lionel Messi and a Peter Olayinka own goal.

On 29 October, Barça defeated Real Valladolid 5–1 at home with goals from Clément Lenglet, Arturo Vidal, a brace from Messi and a goal from Suárez giving Barcelona seven straight wins.

November
On 2 November, Barcelona lost to Levante 3–1 away from home. A penalty converted by Messi gave the Blaugrana the lead in the first half but 3 goals in 7 minutes during the second half handed the home side the victory.

On 5 November, Barcelona drew 0–0 with Slavia Prague in the UEFA Champions League at home.

On 9 November, Barcelona defeated Celta Vigo 4–1 at home. Lionel Messi scored his first hat-trick of the season and Sergio Busquets scored one.

On 23 November, Barcelona narrowly defeated Leganés 2–1. Goals from Luis Suárez and Arturo Vidal cancelled out Youssef En-Nesyri's earlier goal.

On 27 November, Barcelona defeated Borussia Dortmund 3–1 in the UEFA Champions League, securing a spot in the round of 16 and finishing as group winners. Lionel Messi, Luis Suárez, and Antoine Griezmann were the goalscorers.

December
On 1 December, Barcelona defeated Atlético Madrid 1–0 away from home. Messi scored five minutes from time at the Wanda Metropolitano.

On 7 December, Barcelona defeated Real Mallorca 5–2 at home. Messi scored his second hat-trick of the season, while Griezmann and Suárez also appeared on the scoresheet.

On 10 December, a rotated Barcelona team defeated Inter Milan 2–1 away from home in the UEFA Champions League. Carles Pérez and Ansu Fati scored, the latter making history by becoming the youngest goalscorer in the history competition.

On 14 December, Barcelona drew 2–2 away at Real Sociedad. Antoine Griezmann scored against his old club, while Luis Suárez scored the second.

On 18 December, Barcelona drew 0–0 against rivals Real Madrid in El Clásico. It became the first time in over 17 years that both rivals ended goalless in the league, the last time being during the 2002–03 season.

On 21 December, Barcelona defeated Deportivo Alavés 4–1 at home in the last game of the year. Griezmann, Arturo Vidal, Messi, and Suárez all scored. The Uruguayan was involved in all 4 goals, contributing 1 goal and 3 assists.

On 28 December, Barcelona and Real Betis reached an agreement for the loan of Carles Aleñá for the remainder of the season.

January
On 4 January, Barcelona drew 2–2 with local rivals RCD Espanyol in the Barcelona derby. The Blaugrana conceded early when David López nodded in a free kick but Barça made a comeback with goals from Luis Suárez and Arturo Vidal. Espanyol drew late with a goal from Wu Lei.

On 9 January, Barcelona were knocked out of the Supercopa de España after being defeated 3–2 to Atlético Madrid.

On 13 January, Barcelona terminated Ernesto Valverde's contract after two and a half seasons in charge. The club appointed Quique Setién as the new head coach until 30 June 2022.

On 15 January, Barcelona reached an agreement with FC Schalke 04 for the loan on Jean-Clair Todibo for the remainder of the season. The German side paid a €1.5 million loan fee and obtained a buy option for €25 million.

On 19 January, Barcelona defeated Granada 1–0 at home. A second half goal from Messi saw Quique Setién win his first game in charge as a Barça coach.

On 22 January, Barcelona defeated UD Ibiza 2–1 away from home in the Copa del Rey. Ibiza scored first, but a Antoine Griezmann brace secured a comeback for the Blaugrana.

On 25 January, Barcelona lost 2–0 to Valencia away from home. A brace from Maxi Gómez sealed a victory for Los Che.

On 30 January, Barcelona defeated Leganés 5–0 at home in the Copa del Rey. Goals from Antoine Griezmann, Clément Lenglet, Arthur and a Leo Messi brace gave Barça a passage into the next round.

On 31 January, Barcelona reached an agreement with OGC Nice for the loan of Moussa Wagué for the remainder of the season. The French side obtained a buy option for €10 million.

February
On 2 February, Barcelona defeated Levante 2–1 at home in the league. A brace from Ansu Fati gave Barça the win.

On 6 February, Barcelona were eliminated from the Copa del Rey by Athletic Bilbao in the quarter-finals. A late Iñaki Williams header secured a passage for the home side into the semi-finals.

On 9 February, Barcelona defeated Real Betis 3–2 away from home. Goals from Sergio Canales and Nabil Fekir weren't enough for the home side as de Jong, Busquets and Lenglet scored for the away team. Messi assisted all three goals and Lenglet received a second yellow card, getting sent off.

On 15 February, Barcelona defeated Getafe 2–1 at home. Antoine Griezmann and Sergi Roberto scored, but Barça conceded a consolation from Ángel Rodríguez.

On 20 February, Barcelona signed Martin Braithwaite from Leganés for €18 million. Barcelona was given permission from La Liga to sign an emergency forward as Luis Suárez and Ousmane Dembélé were both ruled out with injuries for the rest of the season.

On 22 February, Barcelona defeated Eibar 5–0  at home. Messi scored a first half hat-trick and scored once again late on. Arthur also scored.

On 25 February, Barcelona drew 1–1 with S.S.C. Napoli in the first leg of their UEFA Champions League round of 16 tie. Antoine Griezmann cancelled out Dries Mertens' opener in Naples.

March
On 1 March, Barcelona lost 2–0 to bitter rivals Real Madrid away from home, making it the first time since 25 October 2014 that Barcelona lost at the Santiago Bernabéu in league play. It was Setién's first Clásico as a Barça coach since taking charge in January.

On 7 March, Barcelona defeated Real Sociedad 1–0 at home after Lionel Messi converted a late penalty.

On 12 March, the next two league matchdays were suspended to combat the spread of COVID-19.

On 13 March, the club suspended all first team activity until further notice.

On 23 March, La Liga was suspended indefinitely due to the COVID-19 pandemic.

June
On 13 June, after a three-month hiatus, Barcelona returned to action against Real Mallorca away from home. Barcelona won 4–0 behind closed doors. Arturo Vidal, Martin Braithwaite, Jordi Alba and Messi scored for the Blaugrana. Braithwaite also scored his first goal as a Barça player.

On 16 June, Barcelona defeated Leganés 2–0 at home. Ansu Fati and Messi scored.

On 19 June, Barcelona drew 0–0 away against Sevilla.

On 23 June, Barcelona defeated Athletic Bilbao 1–0 at home. Ivan Rakitić came off to bench to score his first goal of the season.

On 27 June, Barcelona drew 2–2 away against Celta Vigo. Luis Suárez scored twice for the visitors and Fyodor Smolov and Iago Aspas scored for the home side.

On 29 June, Barcelona and Juventus reached an agreement over the transfer of Arthur for a fee of €72 million plus €10 million in variables. The club also confirmed the signing of Miralem Pjanić from Juventus for a fee of €60 million plus €5 million in variables. Arthur and Pjanić will join their respective clubs once the season concludes.

On 30 June, Getafe triggered Marc Cucurella's option to buy for €10 million. On the same day Barça faced Atlético Madrid at home. The Catalans took the lead through a Diego Costa own goal but Atlético equalized with a controversial penalty, converted by Saúl Ñíguez. Barcelona took the lead through another controversial penalty decision and Messi converted his 700th career goal, but Atlético equalized once again with another questionable penalty decision, with Saúl scoring again from the spot.

July
On 5 July, Barcelona defeated Villarreal 4–1 away from home. Goals from Suárez, Griezmann, Fati, and a Pau Torres own goal gave Barça the win.

On 8 July, Barcelona defeated local rivals Espanyol 1–0 at home, relegating them to the Segunda División in the process. Suárez scored his 195th goal, overtaking László Kubala as the club's third top all-time goalscorer.

On 11 July, Barcelona defeated Real Valladolid 1–0 away from home. Arturo Vidal scored the only goal.

On 16 July, Barcelona lost to Osasuna 2–1 at home. Former Barça player José Arnaiz and Roberto Torres scored for the visitors, while Messi scored the only goal for the home side. In the same day, rivals Real Madrid claimed the La Liga title in a 2–1 victory against Villarreal.

On 19 July, Barcelona ended the league season by defeating Alavés 5–0 away from home. Messi scored a brace, Fati, Suárez and Nélson Semedo – with his first of the season – also scored.

August
On 8 August, Barcelona defeated Napoli 3–1 at home in the second leg of their UEFA Champions League round of 16 tie. Lenglet, Messi, and Suárez scored.

On 14 August, Barcelona's season ended after losing 8–2 to Bayern Munich in the UEFA Champions League single-leg quarter-final. Thomas Müller and Barça loanee Philippe Coutinho scored twice, while Ivan Perišić, Serge Gnabry, Joshua Kimmich, and Robert Lewandowski all scored one goal each. David Alaba scored an own goal for the Blaugrana and Suárez scored. The loss was the biggest defeat in history in a UEFA Champions League knockout match.

Kit

Squad information

First Team

From Barcelona B and Youth Academy

Transfers

Players in

Players out

Loans out

Transfer summary
Undisclosed fees are not included in the transfer totals.

Expenditure

Summer:  €255,000,000

Winter:  €18,000,000

Total:  €273,000,000

Income

Summer:  €133,900,000

Winter:  €1,500,000

Total:  €135,400,000

Net totals

Summer:  €121,100,000

Winter:  €16,500,000

Total:  €137,600,000

Pre-season and friendlies

Competitions

Overview

La Liga

Standings

Results summary

Results by round

Matches
The La Liga schedule was announced on 4 July 2019.

Copa del Rey

Supercopa de España

UEFA Champions League

Group stage

Group F

Knockout phase

Round of 16

Quarter-final

Statistics

Squad appearances and goals
Last updated on 14 August 2020.

|-
! colspan="14" style="background:#dcdcdc; text-align:center"|Goalkeepers

|-
! colspan="14" style="background:#dcdcdc; text-align:center"|Defenders

|-
! colspan="14" style="background:#dcdcdc; text-align:center"|Midfielders

|-
! colspan="14" style="background:#dcdcdc; text-align:center"|Forwards

|-
! colspan=14 style=background:#dcdcdc; text-align:center|Players who have made an appearance or had a squad number this season but have left the club

|-
|}

Squad statistics

Goalscorers

As of match played 14 August 2020.

Hat-tricks

(H) – Home; (A) – Away

Disciplinary record

Injury record

References

External links

FC Barcelona seasons
Barcelona
Barcelona
2019–20 in Catalan football